Francesco Coco (born 8 January 1977) is an Italian retired footballer who played as a defender. Although naturally right-footed, he played as a left wing-back (his favourite position) or, more commonly, as a left-back. He had spells with both AC Milan and Inter Milan, also spending a season at Barcelona. In his early career, Coco showed much promise and was regarded as a possible successor to Paolo Maldini; however, he failed to live up to expectations.

Coco won two Serie A league titles and represented Italy at the 2002 FIFA World Cup.

Club career
Born in Paternò, Coco spent the majority of his club career with the Milan clubs; first with A.C. Milan between 1993 and 2002 and later with Inter between 2002 and 2007; he spent the 2001–02 season on loan at FC Barcelona, with generally solid performances (he also had loan spells with Vicenza Calcio and Torino F.C.). He was part of the Milan teams that won the Serie A in 1995–96 and 1998–99.

In 2002, Milan traded Coco to Inter in a part exchange deal for Clarence Seedorf, worth €28 million. Despite reaching the 2002–03 Champions League semi-finals and winning the 2004–05 Coppa Italia, Coco's spell at Inter was blighted by injuries. Coco has since given interviews stating Inter made a mistake by letting him undergo back surgery in November 2003, telling him he would be out for no more than a month. In the end, he had to recover for two years. In 2005–06, he was loaned to Livorno, after rejecting a move to Newcastle United despite playing a friendly against Yeading F.C. where he impressed in a 5–0 home victory. He played one season at Livorno, and after his loan deal, he returned to Inter. During the summer of 2006, he tried to find a new club, but in the end, all negotiations failed and Coco remained at Inter.

In January 2007, he joined English club Manchester City on a trial but after three days the club told him he was not in their plans. Later the English newspapers alleged that Manchester City was no longer interested in him because he had turned up for training smoking a cigarette. After a loan to Torino for the 2006–07 season, he went back to Inter for the first part of the summer but mutually rescinded his contract with the Milan-based club on 7 September 2007. Later Coco declared his intention to quit football in order to pursue an acting career despite the rumoured interest of MLS sides New England Revolution and New York Red Bulls.

International career
Coco played for the Italy U18 team in the intermediary round of the 1995 European Under-18 Football Championship and for the Italy U21 team at the 1996 and 1998 UEFA U-21 Championship qualifying phases, playing also in the final round in the successful 2000 campaign under manager Marco Tardelli. Also, Coco played for the victorious Italy U23 team at the 1997 Mediterranean Games.

Coco's full debut for the Italy national football team came in a 3–0 win against Romania, on 7 October 2000, in a 2002 World Cup qualifying match under Giovanni Trapattoni. He also played for Italy in 2002 FIFA World Cup, and was last called up to the national side in September 2002. He achieved a total of 17 caps with the azzurri.

Style of play
Coco was a quick, physical, and tactically versatile player, who was primarily deployed as an offensive-minded fullback or as a wingback, due to his tenacity, and work-rate, as well as his defensive and offensive attributes. Although he was naturally right footed, he was also capable of playing both on the right and the left flank, and was known for his strong tackling, physicality, determination, and crossing ability with both feet. Due to his pace, stamina, skill, and technique, he was also occasionally utilised as a wide midfielder in a 3–5–2 or 3–4–3 formation. Despite his talent, he was often injury-prone and inconsistent, while he had a difficult character and lacked discipline off the pitch; his chances were often limited both at club and international level, due to the presence of Paolo Maldini in his position, whom Coco had initially been tipped to replace as Milan and Italy's starting left-back.

Off the field
Coco was not only a football player but also a businessman. Together with his father Antonio, they own shops and he has his own clothing label called "Urban 77". Coco is a celebrity in Italy and is well known in the party and society scene in Italy. He also wrote the foreword for the recently published book Mio marito è un calciatore (My husband is a footballer). Coco also famously had a long relationship with the Italian actress, showgirl, and model Manuela Arcuri.

Following his retirement from professional football, Coco stated that he was interested in pursuing an acting career, and accepted to appear in L'Isola dei Famosi, the Italian celebrity adaptation of the TV format Survivor, which he abandoned voluntarily days after the beginning of the show.

Honours

Club

Milan
Serie A (2): 1995–96, 1998–99

Inter
Coppa Italia (1): 2004–05

International
Italy
UEFA Under-21 European Championship (1): 2000
Mediterranean Games (1): 1997

References

External links
Francesco Coco
FootballDatabase provides profile and stats on Francesco Coco
Francesco Coco's clothing label
Profile at UEFA.com
 National Team stats. at FIGC official site
 Profile at tuttocalciatori.net

1977 births
Living people
People from Paternò
Association football fullbacks
Italian footballers
Italy international footballers
Italy youth international footballers
Italy under-21 international footballers
Italian expatriate footballers
Expatriate footballers in Spain
Italian expatriate sportspeople in Spain
A.C. Milan players
L.R. Vicenza players
Torino F.C. players
FC Barcelona players
Inter Milan players
U.S. Livorno 1915 players
Serie A players
La Liga players
2002 FIFA World Cup players
Businesspeople from Sicily
Participants in Italian reality television series
Mediterranean Games gold medalists for Italy
Competitors at the 1997 Mediterranean Games
Mediterranean Games medalists in football
Footballers from Sicily
Sportspeople from the Province of Catania